The San Juan County Council is the legislative body of San Juan County, Washington, United States. The county council consists of three members, all elected at-large.  The council adopts laws, sets policy, and holds final approval over the budget.

Members

History

The county council was created in 2006 as part of a home rule charter, which replaced the traditional three-member county commission with a six-member council. The council was reduced to three members in January 2013. San Juan County was the sixth county in Washington to adopt a home rule charter.

References

External links
San Juan County Council

San Juan County, Washington
County government in Washington (state)